is a Japanese professional baseball pitcher for the Fukuoka SoftBank Hawks of Nippon Professional Baseball (NPB). He previously played for the Texas Rangers in Major League Baseball (MLB) and for the Hokkaido Nippon-Ham Fighters NPB.

Career

Hokkaido Nippon-Ham Fighters
The Hokkaido Nippon-Ham Fighters selected Arihara with the third selection in the 2014 NPB draft.

On May 15, 2015, Arihara made his NPB debut. He won the Pacific League Rookie of the Year after pitching to an 8–8 record with 102 strikeouts. Arihara won the Japan Series in the 2016 season, and was also a NPB All-Star after he posted a 2.94 ERA and 11–9 record in 22 appearances.

In 2017, Arihara registered a 10–13 record and 4.74 ERA in 25 appearances. In 20 games in 2018, Arihara pitched to a 8–5 record and a 4.55 ERA with 87 strikeouts. In 2019, Arihara led the NPB in wins, with 15, and was named an All-Star for the second time in his career. In 2020, Arihara recorded an 8–9 record and 3.46 ERA in 20 games.

After the 2020 season, on November 26, 2020, the Fighters announced they were allowing Arihara to enter the posting system to play in Major League Baseball (MLB).

Texas Rangers
On December 26, 2020, Arihara signed a two-year contract worth $6.2 million with the Texas Rangers of MLB. On April 3, 2021, Arihara made his MLB debut as the starting pitcher against the Kansas City Royals, allowing 3 earned runs in 5.0 innings of work with 1 strikeout. 

On May 22, 2021, it was revealed that Arihara had a posterior circumflex humeral artery aneurysm in his right shoulder, which required surgery, ruling him out for at least 12 weeks. On May 26, he was placed on the 60-day injured list. On September 1, Arihara was activated from the injured list. On September 19, Arihara was designated for assignment by the Rangers. He had his contract selected on August 16, 2022. On September 11, Arihara was designated for assignment after recording a 9.45 ERA in 5 games, and was eventually outrighted to the minors.

Fukuoka SoftBank Hawks
On January 6, 2023, Arihara returned to Japan, signing a deal with the Fukuoka SoftBank Hawks of Nippon Professional Baseball (NPB).

References

External links

 NPB.com

1992 births
Living people
Baseball people from Hiroshima Prefecture
Frisco RoughRiders players
Fukuoka SoftBank Hawks players
Hokkaido Nippon-Ham Fighters players
Japanese expatriate baseball players in the United States
Nippon Professional Baseball pitchers
Nippon Professional Baseball Rookie of the Year Award winners
Major League Baseball pitchers
Major League Baseball players from Japan
Round Rock Express players
Texas Rangers players
Waseda University alumni